Adwin Victor Wilson Wood (August 28, 1886 – September 10, 1979) was a Canadian curler. He was the second of the 1930 Brier Champion team (skipped by his brother Pappy Wood), representing Manitoba.

References

Brier champions
1886 births
1979 deaths
Curlers from Winnipeg
Canadian male curlers